Myobatrachoidea is a superfamily of frogs. It contains two families, both of which are found in Australia, New Guinea, and the Aru Islands. Some sources group these two families into a single family Myobatrachidae. 

Their closest relatives are thought to be the Calyptocephalellidae of southern South America, from which they diverged during the mid-Cretaceous (about 100 million years ago). Together, they comprise the clade Australobatrachia; their common ancestor is thought to have inhabited South America, with the ancestors of Myobatrachoidea dispersing to Australasia during the Cretaceous via (then ice-free) Antarctica. Both families within Myobatrachoidea are thought to have diverged from each other during the Late Cretaceous or during the earliest Paleocene (immediately after the Cretaceous-Paleogene extinction event).

Taxonomy 
Myobatrachoidea contains the following families:

 Limnodynastidae  - 44 species
 Myobatrachidae  - 91 species

References 

 
Australobatrachia
Vertebrate superfamilies
Taxa named by Hermann Schlegel